Highway 937 is a provincial highway in the north-west region of the Canadian province of Saskatchewan. It runs from Highway 921 / Highway 939 westward until it downgrades to a local road. Highway 935 is about 5 km (3 mi) long.

Highway 937's precise end is near its bridge over a stream that flows into the Randall River.

References

937